Seth Kishan Dass was a leather trader, propagator of the Ad-Dharm movement, and a politician.

Biography 
Seth Kishan Dass was born into a Chamar family of Punjab. He traveled to Calcutta and started working there in leather factories. After, some experience he invested in a leather tanning and trading business that flew away. With time Kishan Dass became one of the richest traders of the Jullundhar region and paved the way for fellow Chamars to be in the leather trade. 

Seth became involved in the Ad-Dharm movement with Babu Mangu Ram Mugowalia and purchased land for Ad Dharm mandals. Today, the Ravi Das High School runs in the place of Mandal.

Being an Ambedkarite, he was instrumental in bringing Babasaheb Ambedkar at Bootan Mandi in Jalandhar for the campaign in the 1951 Punjab elections.

He was elected in the first Punjab Legislative Assembly elections in 1937 and won from Jullundur Assembly Constituency (now Adampur) by beating Master Gurbanta Singh, another Ad-Dharm member. But he lost in 1946 Punjab Privincial Assembly elections. He was a member of the All India Scheduled Castes Federation and President of the Punjab unit of SCF.

His sons were Seth Prem Raj and Seth Mool Raj who became the Director of Punjab Mega Leather Cluster. Ltd and Avinash Tanneries at Jalandhar. His grandsons, Steven Kaler and Avinash Chander, are, respectively, an MLA from Phillaur and chief parliamentary secretary for Higher Education & Languages Dept.

Dalit capitalism 
He was one of the first people who pioneered Dalit capitalism in India. Today, Bootan Mandi in Jalandhar is a leather hub because of the capitalist mindset of Kishan Dass. Because of him Dalits, particularly the Chamars (Ad-Dharmi), became seths (merchant) in the Doaba region and many industrialists like Seth Sundar Das, Seth Satpall Mall, Seth Mool Raj, etc. all got to flourish in their businesses.

References 

Dalit politicians
Indian businesspeople
1896 births
1989 deaths
Indian politicians